Darmsbach is the smallest district of the municipality of Remchingen in Baden-Württemberg, Germany.

Geography 
Darmsbach is located directly between Wilferdingen and Nöttingen on the Bundesautobahn 8. It is the most southwestern point of Remchingen. Furthermore, Darmsbach is located on the border of the municipality of Karlsbad in the district of Karlsruhe.

History 
In 1278 Darmsbach is mentioned as an extension settlement that was only established in the High Middle Ages. Darmsbach was a district of the municipality of Nöttingen, which was incorporated into Remchingen on January 1, 1975.

Infrastructure 
Darmsbach has a village center, a day care center and several playgrounds, ball fields, etc. Due to its location, the village is well connected to Wilferdingen with bicycle paths, walking trails, field paths, roads and buses. One can reach Wilferdingen, which offers the central infrastructure of Remchingen, within two minutes. Darmsbach has a soccer club, FC Baden Darmsbach, since the 2010s.

References

External links 

 Site on remchingen.de
Remchingen
Villages in Baden-Württemberg